Rabia Bala Hatun (Ottoman Turkish; رابعہ بالا ھاتون died January 1324) was the wife of Osman I, the founder of the Ottoman Empire.  She was the daughter of the famous Sheikh Edebali and the mother of Alaeddin Pasha of the Ottoman Empire.

Names
Edebali's daughter is called by different names in the sources. Sheikh Edebali's daughter is referred to as "Rabia" in the history of Uric, and as "Mal/Malhun" in those of Aşıkpaşazade, Neşri, Rüstem paşa and Lütfi Paşa.

Marriage to Osman
Edebali became Osman's mentor and eventually girt him with a Gazi sword. Osman at Edebali's dergah, dreamed of a state. This dream, thus led to the establishment of a state. After this, Edebali's daughter was married to Osman I. As a result of this marriage, all the Ahyan sheikhs came under the Ottoman control. This had a major impact on the establishment and development of the Ottoman Beylik.
From the central government records regarding the property she received at the time of her marriage; the village of Kozağaç in the district of Bilecik, where the dervish hospice of her father was located. Her father Sheikh Edebali was an influential religious leader in the Ottoman territories.

Death and burial
She died in 1324. Although she preceded her husband, Osman, she was buried with her father in Bilecik. Bala Hatun's tomb along with that of her mother's, is a famous historical landmark found within the complex of the tomb of Sheikh Edebali. This complex was built by Orhan Ghazi and later renovated by Abdul Hamid II.

In popular culture
 
In the 2019 Turkish historical fiction TV series Kuruluş: Osman, Bala Hatun  is portrayed by Turkish actress Özge Törer.

See also

Ottoman Empire
Ottoman dynasty
List of consorts of the Ottoman Sultans
Ottoman family tree
Ottoman Emperors family tree (simplified)

Further reading

Peirce, Leslie P., The Imperial Harem: Women and Sovereignty in the Ottoman Empire, Oxford University Press, 1993,  (paperback).
Bahadıroğlu, Yavuz,    "Resimli Osmanlı Tarihi, Nesil Yayınları" (Ottoman History with Illustrations, Nesil Publications) 15th Ed., 2009,  (Hardcover).

References

13th-century consorts of Ottoman sultans
1342 deaths
14th-century consorts of Ottoman sultans